Pandox AB is a hotel property company. The company engages in ownership and management of hotel property. Pandox leases its hotel properties to hotel operators or runs hotel operations in its own hotel properties. Pandox owns approximately 150 hotel properties with a total of 35,000 hotel rooms. The hotel properties are located in 15 European countries.

The largest markets calculated in terms of property value are Germany, Sweden, Great Britain, Belgium and Finland. The hotel properties had a market value of approximately SEK 60 billion as of March 31, 2022.

Pandox is listed on Nasdaq Stockholm. The largest owners in terms of number of votes are the Norwegian companies Eiendomsspar AS, Helene Sundt AS and Christian Sundt AS.

History

1990s
In 1995, Pandox was formed by Securum and Skanska to restructure 18 properties and three smaller hotel operations during the financial and property crisis.
 
In 1997, Pandox was listed on Nasdaq Stockholm. At the listing, Pandox was valued at approximately SEK 1.3 billion. Pandox's IPO led to 4,000 new shareholders.

2000s 
In 2000, Pandox acquired Scandic's property-owning company and the company Hotellus. With the acquisition of the company Hotellus, Pandox took over 16 hotel properties, of which eight are in Sweden, three in Germany, three in Belgium, one in Denmark and one in England. After the acquisition of Hotellus, Pandox owned a total of 47 hotel properties and 8,500 hotel rooms.

In 2003, the Norwegian investors, the property company Eiendomsspar AS and the finance company Sundt AS, made a bid for Pandox worth SEK 2.6 billion.

In 2004, Pandox was bought out of Nasdaq Stockholm by Eidenomsspar AS and Sundt AS.

From 2004 to 2014, under the ownership of Eiendomsspars and Sundt AS, the market value of Pandox's property portfolio developed from approximately SEK 6 billion to approximately SEK 27 billion.

2010s 
In 2010, Pandox announced the acquisition of Norgani Hotels, with a portfolio of 73 hotel properties in Sweden, Finland, Norway and Denmark, with a transaction value of close to SEK 10 billion.

On 18 June 2015, Pandox was relisted on Nasdaq Stockholm The listing meant that the existing owners sold 60,000,000 B shares, corresponding to 40 percent of the company. 60 percent of the shareholding remained with the existing owners Eiendomsspar AS and Sundt AS.

In 2015, Pandox acquired a portfolio of 18 hotel properties with 3,415 rooms in Germany.

In 2017, Lone Star Funds sold 37 hotel properties with 4,694 rooms in UK and Ireland to Pandox for 800 million pounds.

From 2015 to 2019, the company has invested around SEK 24 billion in acquisitions and investments in hotel properties mainly outside the Nordic region.

2020s 
During 2020, Pandox was negatively affected by the coronavirus pandemic. Revenue fell by 50 percent, while net operating income decreased by approximately 45 percent, compared to 2019.

In May 2021, the former CEO and founder Anders Nissen died.

Business segments

Property management 
Property management is Pandox's largest business segment in terms of revenue, and in 2021 the business segment accounted for approximately 74 percent of the company's revenue. The business segment consists of Pandox acquiring and managing hotel properties, then leasing them out under long-term contracts to hotel operators.

Operator activities 
In 2021, Pandox's operator activities accounted for approximately 26 percent of the company's revenue. The business segment consists of Pandox both owning the hotel property and managing the operation of the hotel. Pandox can operate a hotel by using one of its own brands or by signing a franchise agreement with an external hotel operator who thereby is allowed to manage the operation of the hotel.

Markets 
Pandox is active in 15 countries: Sweden, Norway, Finland, Denmark, Germany, the Netherlands, Austria, Switzerland, Belgium, Canada, Ireland and Great Britain (including the sub-markets England, Scotland, Northern Ireland, Wales). As of December 31, 2021, the distribution between Pandox's property management and operator activities was according to the tables below.

References

External links

Multinational companies headquartered in Sweden
Swedish brands
Companies listed on Nasdaq Stockholm
Swedish companies established in 1997
Property management companies
Hospitality companies of Sweden